is a volcanic caldera lake in Shikotsu-Toya National Park, Abuta District, Hokkaidō, Japan. It is part of "Toya Caldera and Usu Volcano Global Geopark" which joins in Global Geoparks Network. The stratovolcano of Mount Usu lies on the southern rim of the caldera.  The lake is nearly circular, being 10 kilometers in diameter from east–west and 9 kilometers from north–south. The town of Tōyako comprises most of the area surrounding the lake and the town of Sōbetsu is located on the eastern side.

Lake Tōya is said to be the northernmost lake in Japan that never ices (with competing claim by nearby Lake Shikotsu), and the second most transparent lake in Japan. Nakajima Island (not to be confused with another island of the same name in Lake Kussharo) is a recursive island in the middle of the lake which houses the Tōya Lake Forest Museum.

Lake Tōya was called Kim'un-to (キムウン (kim'un) means "in the mountain" and ト (to) means "lake") by the Ainu. In the Meiji era, Japanese pioneers named the lake Tōya after the Ainu expression to ya, which means "lakeshore, land around a lake."

The 2008 G8 Summit was held at Lake Tōya and The Windsor Hotel Toya Resort & Spa.

Lake Toya's surroundings 
Surrounding the lake, there are numerous parks as well as walking trails, such as the Waterfront Forest Lane (Takarada Nature Observation Trail) and the Nishiyama Sanroku Crater Trail. Several onsen managed by the town of Toyako offer a view of the lake. There are also a number of hand and footbaths nearby. Uniquely, large vending machines near the onsen offer spring water that can be taken to be used at home.

Gallery

In popular culture 
 The setting of the 2012 film Bread of Happiness is on the shores of the lake.
In the manga and anime Gintama,  is engraved on the Bokutō of the main character Gintoki Sakata (坂田 銀時, Sakata Gintoki).
It is the model for Lake Kiriya in the anime Celestial Method.
Lake Verity in Pokémon Diamond and Pearl and Pokémon Platinum is based on this lake as the Sinnoh region is a fictionalized version of Hokkaido.

See also
 List of lakes in Japan
 List of volcanoes in Japan

References

 
 Geographical Survey Institute, last access 28 May 2008

External links
 Guide of Lake Toya
 Toya Usu Geopark
 Toya Caldera - Geological Survey of Japan

Calderas of Hokkaido
Volcanic crater lakes
Shikotsu-Tōya National Park
Lakes of Hokkaido
VEI-7 volcanoes
Pleistocene calderas